Chadian coup d'état may refer to:

2013 Chadian coup d'état attempt
2006 Chadian coup d'état attempt
2004 Chadian coup d'état attempt
1990 Chadian coup d'état
1989 Sudanese coup d'état
1975 Chadian coup d'état